The Pârâul Mare is a left tributary of the river Mureș in Romania. It discharges into the Mureș in Ususău.

References

Rivers of Romania
Rivers of Arad County